Tenma, known as ASTRO-B before launch (COSPAR 1983-011A, SATCAT 13829), was a Japanese X-ray astronomy satellite, developed by the Institute of Space and Astronautical Science. It was launched on February 20, 1983, using a M-3S rocket on the M-3S-3 mission.

Battery failure in July 1984 caused the operation to become limited, and continuing problems lead to the termination of X-ray observation in 1985. It reentered the atmosphere on January 19, 1989 (other sources, for example the NORAD catalog of satellites, say decay date (the day it stopped working)was 17 May 1988).

Highlights 
 Discovery of the iron helium-like emission from the galactic ridge 
 Iron line discovery and/or study in many LMXRB, HMXRB and AGN 
 Discovery of an absorption line at 4 keV in the X1636-536 Burst spectra

See also

References

External links 
 Tenma at ISAS
 Tenma at NASA

1983 in spaceflight
Satellites formerly orbiting Earth
Satellites of Japan
Spacecraft launched in 1983
X-ray telescopes